The short track speed skating competitions at the 2017 Southeast Asian Games in Kuala Lumpur will take place at Empire City Ice Arena in Damansara, Kuala Lumpur.

The 2017 Games feature competitions in six events (3 events for each gender).

Competition schedule

Participation

Participating nations

 
 
 
 
 
 *

Athlete did not compete

Medal summary

Medal table

Men's events

Women's events

References

External links
  

2017
2017 Southeast Asian Games events
Southeast Asian Games